Paul Ratcliffe (born 12 November 1973 in Salford) is a British slalom canoeist who competed from the early 1990s to the mid-2000s. Competing in two Summer Olympics, he won a silver medal in the K1 event in Sydney in 2000.

Ratcliffe also won three medals at the ICF Canoe Slalom World Championships with a gold (K1 team: 1997) and two bronzes (K1: 1997, 1999).

He won overall World Cup title in K1 in three consecutive seasons between 1998 and 2000. He is also a two-time European Champion.

World Cup individual podiums

References

External links

1973 births
English male canoeists
Canoeists at the 1996 Summer Olympics
Canoeists at the 2000 Summer Olympics
Living people
Olympic canoeists of Great Britain
Olympic silver medallists for Great Britain
Olympic medalists in canoeing
Sportspeople from Salford
British male canoeists
Medalists at the 2000 Summer Olympics
Medalists at the ICF Canoe Slalom World Championships